Emaciation is defined as the state of extreme thinness from absence of body fat and muscle wasting usually resulting from malnutrition.

Characteristics
Emaciation manifests physically as thin limbs, pronounced and protruding bones, sunken eyes, dry skin, thinning hair, a bloated stomach, and a dry or coated tongue in humans. Emaciation is often accompanied by halitosis, hyponatremia, hypokalemia, anemia, improper function of lymph and the lymphatic system, and pleurisy and edema.

Causes

Emaciation can be caused by undernutrition, malaria and cholera, tuberculosis and other infectious diseases with prolonged fever, parasitic infections, many forms of cancer and their treatments, lead poisoning, and eating disorders like anorexia nervosa.

Emaciation is widespread in least developed countries and was a major cause of death in Nazi concentration camps during World War II.

Animals

A lack of resources in the habitat, disease, or neglect and cruelty from humans in captivity can result in emaciation in animals. In the rehabilitation of emaciated animals, the specific dietary needs of each animal have to be considered to avoid causing harm.

See also
Cachexia
Malnutrition

References

External links 

Malnutrition